Devarattam is a Tamil Word derived from the words "Devar" or Thevar (Tamil meaning: the god/ king/ or warriors) and "Attam" (Tamil meaning: the dance). Traditionally, it was performed by the kings and warriors after a successful battle particularly in pandyan dynasty, Later it was danced by the some group of peoples of Maravar clan belongs to mukkulathor community who is refereed as Devar in present Madurai and nearby regions believe they are related to the Pandya dynasty, parallelly devarattam was also performed by the kings and warriors of the chola dynasty in ancient days as a joy of victory, still it was followed by some group of peoples of Kallar clan belongs to mukkulathor community who claim descent from the Chola dynasty and also refereed as Devar in present Thanjavur and nearby regions of south-east Tamil Nadu, After the fall of both chola and pandya dynasties both clans not celebrates the joy of victory by devarattam. In the period following Indian independence, devarattam is performed mostly by the Rajakambalathu Nayakkar a Telugu origin community those believes they are migrants from Andhra Pradesh Vijayanagar dynasty of South India and settled in Tamil Nadu for many generations and upkeep Tamil traditions and religious practices also socially friendship with Mukkulathor Devar as well as all communities of Tamil Nadu, at present devarattam was mostly performed only by the professional dancers of the same community during the temple festivals and other functions in Tamil Nadu

References

Tamil history
Folk dances of Tamil Nadu